James Haughton Langston (25 May 1796 – 19 October 1863) was a British landowner and Member of Parliament.

Life
He was the son of John Langston of Sarsden House, Oxfordshire, and his wife, Sarah. He was educated at Eton College (1811). He maticulated at Christ Church, Oxford in 1814, graduating DCL in 1819.

In 1812 Langston succeeded his father, inheriting the Sarsden estate. He was appointed High Sheriff of Oxfordshire for 1819–20 and verderer of Wychwood Forest.

Langston served as MP for New Woodstock from 1820 to 1826 and Oxford from 1826 to 1834 and from 1841 to 1863. He died in 1863. He had married the Hon. Julia Moreton, the daughter of Thomas Reynolds Moreton, 4th Baron Ducie. They had one daughter who survived into adulthood, Julia, to whom he bequeathed his Oxfordshire estate. In 1849 she married her cousin Lord Moreton, later 3rd Earl of Ducie.

References

External links 
 

1796 births
1863 deaths
High Sheriffs of Oxfordshire
People educated at Eton College
Alumni of Christ Church, Oxford
Liberal Party (UK) MPs for English constituencies
UK MPs 1820–1826
UK MPs 1826–1830
UK MPs 1830–1831
UK MPs 1831–1832
UK MPs 1832–1835
UK MPs 1841–1847
UK MPs 1847–1852
UK MPs 1852–1857
UK MPs 1857–1859
UK MPs 1859–1865
Whig (British political party) MPs for English constituencies